The ninth season of RuPaul's Drag Race began airing on March 24, 2017, on VH1. The returning judges included RuPaul, Michelle Visage, Ross Mathews and Carson Kressley. Fourteen drag queens (including one returnee) competed for the title of "America's Next Drag Superstar". The prizes for the winner are a one-year supply of Anastasia Beverly Hills cosmetics, a cash prize of $100,000, and a crown and scepter provided by Shandar. The full list of contestants was revealed on February 2, 2017. This season saw the return of season eight contestant Cynthia Lee Fontaine, who finished the competition in 10th place.

The winner of the ninth season of RuPaul's Drag Race was Sasha Velour, with Peppermint being the runner-up and Valentina winning Miss Congeniality.

Production
Bob the Drag Queen revealed on her Sibling Watchery podcast that season 9 started filming one week after the season 8 finale.

Contestants

Ages, names, and cities stated are at time of filming.

Notes:

Contestant progress

Lip syncs
Legend:

Guest judges
Listed in chronological order:

Lady Gaga, singer, songwriter, and actress
The B-52's, new wave band
Todrick Hall, actor and singer
Cheyenne Jackson, actor and singer
Jeffrey Bowyer-Chapman, actor and model
Naya Rivera, actress and singer
Meghan Trainor, singer and songwriter
Candis Cayne, actress
Denis O'Hare, actor
Jennie Garth, actress
Tori Spelling, actress and television personality
Fortune Feimster, writer, comedian, and actress
Tamar Braxton, singer and television personality
Lisa Robertson, television personality and former QVC host
Noah Galvin, actor
Kesha, singer and songwriter
Zaldy, Emmy-winning fashion designer
Andie MacDowell, actress
Joan Smalls, fashion model

Special guests

Guests who appeared in episodes, but did not judge on the main stage.

Episode 2:

Lisa Kudrow, actress and comedian

Episode 12:

Todrick Hall, actor and singer

Episodes

Ratings

Notes

References

External links

2017 American television seasons
2017 in LGBT history
RuPaul's Drag Race seasons